Risemedet Mountain is a large mountain that marks the eastern end of the Gjelsvik Mountains in Queen Maud Land. It was mapped by Norwegian cartographers from surveys and air photos by the Sixth Norwegian Antarctic Expedition (1956–60) and named Risemedet (the giant landmark).

The Medmulen Spurs extend from the north side of the mountain. Medhalsen Saddle is an ice saddle just south of Risemedet Mountain.

See also
 List of mountains of Queen Maud Land

References

External links

Mountains of Queen Maud Land
Princess Martha Coast